Active living is a lifestyle that integrates physical activity into everyday routines, such as walking to the store or biking to work. Active living is not a formalized exercise program or routine, but instead means to incorporate physical activity, which is defined as any form of movement, into everyday life. Active living brings together urban planners, architects, transportation engineers, public health professionals, activists and other professionals to build places that encourage active living and physical activity. One example includes efforts to build sidewalks, crosswalks, pedestrian crossing signals, and other ways for children to walk safely to and from school, as seen in the Safe Routes to School program. Recreational opportunities (parks, fitness centres etc.) close to the home or workplace, walking trails, and bike lanes for transportation also contribute to a more active lifestyle. Active living includes any physical activity or recreation activity and contributes to a healthier lifestyle. Furthermore, active living addresses health concerns, such as obesity and chronic disease, by helping people have a physically active lifestyle. Communities that support active living gain health benefits, economic advantages, and improved quality of life.

For achieving active living, people need at least 150 minutes of moderate physical activity or 75 minutes of strong physical activity every week.

History
Active living is a growing field that emerged from the early work of the Centers for Disease Control and Prevention (CDC) with the release of the Surgeon's General Report on Physical Activity and Health in 1996.  In 1997, the CDC began the development of an initiative called Active Community Environments (ACEs) coordinated by Rich Killingsworth (the founding director of active living by Design ) and Tom Schmid, a senior health scientist.  The main programming thrust of ACEs was an emerging initiative called Safe Routes to School that was catalysed by a program designed by Rich Killingsworth and Jessica Shisler at CDC called KidsWalk-to-School. This program provided much-needed attention to the connections of the built environment and health, especially obesity and physical inactivity.  In 2000, Robert Wood Johnson Foundation formally launched their active living initiative. Led by Karen Gerlach, Marla Hollander, Kate Kraft and Tracy Orleans, this national effort comprised five national programs - Active Living by Design, Active Living Research, Active Living Leadership, Active Living Network and Active for Life.  The goals of these programs was multifaceted and included; building the research base, establishing best practices and community models, supporting leadership efforts and connecting multi-sectoral professionals. The overarching goal to develop an understanding of how the built environment impacted physical activity and what could be done to increase physical activity.

Benefits
There are many health related benefits to being physically active and living an active life.  Active living can help to reduce the risk of chronic diseases, improve overall health and well-being, reduce stress levels, minimize health related medical costs, help you to maintain a healthy weight, assist in proper balance and posture and the maintenance of healthy bones and strong muscles.  Active living can also improve sleeping patterns and aid in the prevention of risk factors for heart disease such as blood cholesterol levels, diabetes and hypertension.

Running can reduce the level of mortality from many diseases by 27%.

Types of physical activity
There are four types of physical exercises that medical professionals recommend in order to improve and maintain physical abilities: endurance, flexibility, balance, and strength activities.

 Endurance activities increase your heart rate and strengthen your heart and lungs. Examples include dancing, skating, climbing stairs, cycling, swimming and brisk walking.
 Flexibility activities improve your body's ability to move and assist in keeping your muscles and joints relaxed. Examples include yard work, vacuuming, stretching and golf.
 Balance activities reduce the risk of falling and focuses primarily on lower-body strength. Examples include standing up after being seated, Tai Chi, and standing on a single foot.
 Strength activities create and maintain muscle, while also keeping bones strong. Examples include raking leaves, carrying groceries, climbing stairs, lifting free weights, and doing push-ups.

Endurance, flexibility, balance, and strength activities can be incorporated into daily routines and promote active living. For example, activities such as household chores and taking the stairs can fit into more than one of the above categories.

Recommendations
In Canada, the Public Health Agency of Canada supported the Canadian Society for Exercise Physiology (CSEP) to review the  Canada's Physical Activity Guides, which were updated and replaced with the Get Active Tip Sheets.  The Get Active Tip Sheets are broken down into 4 age categories (5–11, 12–17, 18–64, and 65 & older).

The Get Active Tip Sheets recommend that children aged 5–11 and youth aged 12–17 should participate in at least 60 minutes of moderate to vigorous physical activity each day.  The recommendation for adults 18–64 and for older adults 65 years and older is at least 2.5 hours of moderate to vigorous physical activity per week. These minutes do not all need to be done at the same time, but the recommendation is a minimum of 10 minutes at a time.

Initiatives
In Canada, there are many active living initiatives currently in place.  One of the most well-known programs is the ParticipACTION program, which aims to encourage Canadians to move more and increase their physical activity levels.  Their mission statement is "ParticipACTION is the national voice of physical activity and sport participation in Canada. Through leadership in communications, capacity building and knowledge exchange, we inspire and support Canadians to move more."  Since the 1970s, ParticipACTION has been motivating Canadians to live actively and participate in sports.

See also
 
  - automobile oriented transportation
 
 Basal metabolic rate - the rate at which the body uses energy while at rest to maintain vital functions such as breathing and keeping warm
 
  - transport on cycle
 
 
 National Physical Activity Guidelines
 
 
 Sedentary lifestyle - a lifestyle with a lot of sitting and lying down, with very little to no exercise
 
 Urban vitality - the extent to which a place feels alive or lively

References

External links
 Active Living Network
 Alberta Centre for Active Living
 Livable Communities Resource Guide
 National Center for Safe Routes to School
 Safe Routes to School National Partnership

Urban planning
Health promotion
Physical exercise
Health and transport